Drums O' Voodoo (also known as Louisiana and She Devil) is a 1934 film about voodoo.  The film was written by J. Augustus Smith, based on his 1933 play Louisiana, and was directed by Arthur Hoerl.

Cast
This is the cast of characters as listed in the title sequence of the film.
 Laura Bowman as Aunt Hagar
 Edna Barr as Myrtle Simpson
 Lionel Monagas as Ebenezer
 J. Augustus Smith as Amos Berry
 Morris McKenney as Thomas Catt
 A. B. Comathiere as Deacon Dunson
 Alberta Perkins as Sister Knight
 Fred Bonny as Brother Zero
 Paul Johnson as Brother August
 Trixie Smith Smith as Sister Marguerite
 Carrie Huff as Sister Zuran

References

External links
 Drums o' Voodoo at the AFI Catalog of Feature Films

American films based on plays
1934 films
Films directed by Arthur Hoerl
American black-and-white films
1934 drama films
American drama films
1930s English-language films
1930s American films